Pungsan-eup is a town in Andong in Southeast section of South Korea.  It stands on the Nakdong River to the west of Andong's city center.  It lies on the standard tourist course between downtown Andong and the Hahoe Maeul folk village in Pungcheon-myeon.  Local landmarks include the Yucheon Museum of Hanji Art.

Pungsan is a noted center of traditional Korean Confucianism, and is home to the former yangban lineages  Pungsan Ryu, Pungsan Hong and Pungsan Kim.

Pungsan Hong
All ancestry of Andong's Pungsan Hong may be traced to the Goryeo dynasty's Hong Ji-gyeong later known as a great master of Korean classical verse in the Joseon Dynasty. The Pungsan Hong were known as yangban among yangbans. Hong Jin was a direct descendant of Hong Ji-gyeong.

See also
Andong
Administrative divisions of South Korea
Geography of South Korea

References

External links
  Pungsan-eup Town Office
  Pungsan Hong clan profile

Andong
Towns and townships in North Gyeongsang Province